On-demand or on demand may refer to:

Manufacturing
 Build-on-demand
 Just-in-time manufacturing, a methodology for production
 Print on demand, printing technology and business process in which new copies of a document are not printed until an order has been received

Computing and Internet
 Certification on demand, a digital certificate process
 Code on demand, a concept in distributed computing
 Software as a service (SaaS), also referred to as on-demand software
 On demand anti-virus protection, security tools used to detect and remove malware on an on-demand basis
 Ballot on Demand, software used to generate paper ballots, provided by Election Systems & Software
 Gaming on demand, a type of online gaming
On-demand event is pre-recorded materials available anytime
 Content on demand:
 Video on demand, a type of streaming video or movie service used by services such as Netflix
 Music on demand, music streaming services like iTunes

Television and video media providers
 Astro On Demand, base a subscription Hong Kong TVB Channel
 Bell Fibe TV OnDemand
 Comcast Xfinity OnDemand
 On Demand (Sky), a video on demand service for BSkyB's Sky satellite TV service
 OnDemand, UK-based TV company owned by the On Demand Group
 Rogers Cable OnDemand
 Time Warner Cable OnDemand

Other uses
 Demand responsive transport, public transit service
 Personal rapid transit, an on-demand transport service